The 1991 Portuguese legislative election took place on 6 October. The election renewed all 230 members of the Assembly of the Republic. There was a reduction of 20 seats compared with previous elections, due to the 1989 Constitutional revision.

The Social Democratic Party, under the lead of Cavaco Silva, won a historic third term and won with an absolute majority for the second consecutive turn, achieving a higher share than in the previous election, losing, however, 13 MPs due to the reduction of the overall number from the original 250 to 230. Cavaco Silva became the first Prime Minister since Hintze Ribeiro, in 1904, to lead a party into three successive democratic election victories.

The Socialist Party, at the time led by Jorge Sampaio, the future President of Portugal, increased its share by 7% and gained 12 MPs, but did not manage to avoid the absolute majority of the Social Democrats. Like four and six years earlier, and like 1979 and 1980, the PS failed to win a single district. In the first legislative election after the fall of the Eastern Bloc, the communist dominated Democratic Unity Coalition lost much of its electoral influence, losing 14 MPs and 4% of the voting, but were able to hold on to the district of Beja by a slight margin over the PSD.

On the right, the CDS could not recover its past influence, mainly to the effect of tactical voting for the Social Democratic Party by right-wing voters, increasing its parliamentary group by only 1 MP. The National Solidarity Party, using a populist campaign, achieved for the first time an MP, in what would be the only presence of such party in the Parliament.

Voter turnout fell to 67.8%, and for the first time below 70% of the electorate.

Background

Leadership changes

CDS 1988 leadership election
After CDS's poor results, just 4%, in the 1987 general elections, then CDS leader Adriano Moreira announced he would leave the leadership and called a party congress to elect a new leader. Diogo Freitas do Amaral, former party leader and defeated candidate in the 1986 presidential election, returned to the party and was the sole candidate to the party's leadership. 

|- style="background-color:#E9E9E9"
! align="center" colspan=2 style="width:  60px"|Candidate
! align="center" style="width:  50px"|Votes
! align="center" style="width:  50px"|%
|-
|bgcolor=|
| align=left | Diogo Freitas do Amaral
| colspan="2" align=right | Voice vote
|-
|- style="background-color:#E9E9E9"
| colspan=2 style="text-align:left;" |   Turnout
| align=right |
| align=right | 100.0
|-
| colspan="4" align=left|Source: 
|}

PS 1989 leadership election
In the 1987 general election the PS polled 2nd with just 22%, while the PSD won a historic absolute majority. Then party leader, Vítor Constâncio was facing pressures because of his strategy, with interferences also from President Mário Soares, and, adding to this, his difficulty in finding a strong candidate for Lisbon to contest the 1989 local elections. Because of these pressures, Constâncio resign in late 1988 and a party congress to elect a new leader was called for mid January 1989. Two candidates were on the ballot, Jorge Sampaio and Jaime Gama. Sampaio was easily elected as PS leader.

|- style="background-color:#E9E9E9"
! align="center" colspan=2 style="width:  60px"|Candidate
! align="center" style="width:  50px"|Votes
! align="center" style="width:  50px"|%
|-
|bgcolor=|
| align=left | Jorge Sampaio
| align=center | WIN
| align=right | 
|-
|bgcolor=|
| align=left | Jaime Gama
| align=right | 
| align=right | 
|-
|- style="background-color:#E9E9E9"
| colspan=2 style="text-align:left;" |   Turnout
| align=right |
| align=center | 
|-
| colspan="4" align=left|Source: 
|}

PRD 1991 leadership election
The Democratic Renewal Party's results in the 1987 election were disappointing and António Ramalho Eanes resigned from the leadership. Hermínio Martinho returned to the leadership, but the party was plagued by deep divisions on its ideology and strategy, with key members, including Ramalho Eanes, announcing their departure from the party In June 1991, the party held a leadership ballot between Hermínio Martinho and Pedro Canavarro. Martinho defended the dissolution of the party, while Canavarro proposed the continuation of the party. The ballot results gave Canavarro a landslide victory. The results were the following:

|- style="background-color:#E9E9E9"
! align="center" colspan=2 style="width:  60px"|Candidate
! align="center" style="width:  50px"|Votes
! align="center" style="width:  50px"|%
|-
|bgcolor=|
| align=left | Pedro Canavarro
| align=right | 145
| align=right | 79.2
|-
|bgcolor=|
| align=left | Hermínio Martinho
| align=right | 38
| align=right | 20.8
|-
|- style="background-color:#E9E9E9"
| colspan=2 style="text-align:left;" |   Turnout
| align=right | 183
| align=center | 
|-
| colspan="4" align=left|Source: 
|}

Electoral system 
The Assembly of the Republic has 230 members elected to four-year terms. The total number of MPs was reduced in 1989, during the Constitutional amendments, to 230 from the previous 250. Governments do not require absolute majority support of the Assembly to hold office, as even if the number of opposers of government is larger than that of the supporters, the number of opposers still needs to be equal or greater than 116 (absolute majority) for both the Government's Programme to be rejected or for a motion of no confidence to be approved.

The number of seats assigned to each district depends on the district magnitude. The use of the d'Hondt method makes for a higher effective threshold than certain other allocation methods such as the Hare quota or Sainte-Laguë method, which are more generous to small parties.

For these elections, and compared with the 1987 elections, the MPs distributed by districts were the following:

Parties
The table below lists the parties represented in the Assembly of the Republic during the 5th legislature (1987–1991) and that also partook in the election:

Campaign period

Party slogans

Candidates' debates
No debates between the main parties were held as the PSD leader and Prime Minister, Aníbal Cavaco Silva, refused to take part in any debate.

Opinion polling

The following table shows the opinion polls of voting intention of the Portuguese voters before the election. Those parties that are listed were represented in parliament (1987-1991). Included is also the result of the Portuguese general elections in 1987 and 1991 for reference.

Note, until 2000, the publication of opinion polls in the last week of the campaign was forbidden.

National summary of votes and seats

|-
| colspan=11| 
|-  
! rowspan="2" colspan=2 style="background-color:#E9E9E9" align=left|Parties
! rowspan="2" style="background-color:#E9E9E9" align=right|Votes
! rowspan="2" style="background-color:#E9E9E9" align=right|%
! rowspan="2" style="background-color:#E9E9E9" align=right|±
! colspan="5" style="background-color:#E9E9E9" align="center"|MPs
! rowspan="2" style="background-color:#E9E9E9;text-align:right;" |MPs %/votes %
|- style="background-color:#E9E9E9"
! style="background-color:#E9E9E9;text-align=center|1987
! style="background-color:#E9E9E9;text-align=center|1991
! style="background-color:#E9E9E9" align=right|±
! style="background-color:#E9E9E9" align=right|%
! style="background-color:#E9E9E9" align=right|±
|-
| 
|2,902,351||50.60||0.4||148|||135||13||58.70||0.5||1.16
|-
| 
|1,670,758||29.13||6.9||60||72||12||31.30||7.3||1.07
|-
| 
|504,583||8.80||3.3||31||17||14||7.39||5.0||0.84
|-
| 
|254,317||4.43||0.0||4||5||1||2.17||0.6||0.49
|-
|style="width: 10px" bgcolor=#000080 align="center" | 
|align=left|National Solidarity
|96,096||1.68||||||1||||0.44||||0.39
|-
| 
|64,159||1.12||0.5||0||0||0||0.00||0.0||0.0
|-
| 
|48,542||0.85||0.5||0||0||0||0.00||0.0||0.0
|-
| 
|35,077||0.61||4.3||7||0||7||0.00||2.8||0.0
|-
| 
|25,216||0.44||0.0||0||0||0||0.00||0.0||0.0
|-
| 
|10,842||0.19||||||0||||0.00||||0.0
|-
|  
|6,661||0.12||||||0||||0.00||||0.0
|-
|style="width: 10px" bgcolor=#E2062C align="center" | 
|align=left|People's Democratic Union
|6,157||0.11||0.8||0||0||0||0.00||0.0||0.0
|-
|colspan=2 align=left style="background-color:#E9E9E9"|Total valid 
|width="65" align="right" style="background-color:#E9E9E9"|5,624,759
|width="40" align="right" style="background-color:#E9E9E9"|98.07
|width="40" align="right" style="background-color:#E9E9E9"|0.3
|width="40" align="right" style="background-color:#E9E9E9"|250
|width="40" align="right" style="background-color:#E9E9E9"|230
|width="40" align="right" style="background-color:#E9E9E9"|20
|width="40" align="right" style="background-color:#E9E9E9"|100.00
|width="40" align="right" style="background-color:#E9E9E9"|0.0
|width="40" align="right" style="background-color:#E9E9E9"|—
|-
|colspan=2|Blank ballots
|47,652||0.83||0.1||colspan=6 rowspan=4|
|-
|colspan=2|Invalid ballots
|63,020||1.10||0.2
|-
|colspan=2 align=left style="background-color:#E9E9E9"|Total 
|width="65" align="right" style="background-color:#E9E9E9"|5,735,431
|width="40" align="right" style="background-color:#E9E9E9"|100.00
|width="40" align="right" style="background-color:#E9E9E9"|
|-
|colspan=2|Registered voters/turnout
||8,462,357||67.78||3.8
|-
| colspan=11 align=left | Source: Comissão Nacional de Eleições
|}

Distribution by constituency

|- class="unsortable"
!rowspan=2|Constituency!!%!!S!!%!!S!!%!!S!!%!!S!!%!!S
!rowspan=2|TotalS
|- class="unsortable" style="text-align:center;"
!colspan=2 | PSD
!colspan=2 | PS
!colspan=2 | CDU
!colspan=2 | CDS
!colspan=2 | PSN
|-
| style="text-align:left;" | Azores
| style="background:; color:white;"|64.1
| 4
| 25.8
| 1
| 1.3
| -
| 3.4
| -
|colspan="2" bgcolor="#AAAAAA"|
| 5
|-
| style="text-align:left;" | Aveiro
| style="background:; color:white;"|58.6
| 9
| 27.8
| 4
| 2.8
| -
| 6.1
| 1
| 1.3
| -
| 14
|-
| style="text-align:left;" | Beja
| 29.3
| 1
| 28.4
| 1
| style="background:red; color:white;"|30.4
| 2
| 2.3
| -
| 1.0
| -
| 4
|-
| style="text-align:left;" | Braga
| style="background:; color:white;"|53.6
| 10
| 31.5
| 5
| 4.6
| -
| 5.6
| 1
| 0.8
| -
| 16
|-
| style="text-align:left;" | Bragança
| style="background:; color:white;"|57.9
| 3
| 25.7
| 1
| 2.1
| -
| 8.2
| -
| 1.5
| -
| 4
|-
| style="text-align:left;" | Castelo Branco
| style="background:; color:white;"|51.8
| 3
| 32.4
| 2
| 4.6
| -
| 3.9
| -
| 2.3
| -
| 5
|-
| style="text-align:left;" | Coimbra
| style="background:; color:white;"|49.9
| 6
| 34.4
| 4
| 5.0
| -
| 3.5
| -
| 1.7
| -
| 10
|-
| style="text-align:left;" | Évora
| style="background:; color:white;"|35.0
| 2
| 25.9
| 1
| 27.1
| 1
| 2.8
| -
| 1.4
| -
| 4
|-
| style="text-align:left;" | Faro
| style="background:; color:white;"|50.8
| 5
| 31.2
| 3
| 7.2
| -
| 2.8
| -
| 2.2
| -
| 8
|-
| style="text-align:left;" | Guarda
| style="background:; color:white;"|58.6
| 3
| 26.8
| 1
| 2.3
| -
| 5.9
| -
| 1.3
| -
| 4
|-
| style="text-align:left;" | Leiria
| style="background:; color:white;"|61.2
| 7
| 23.0
| 3
| 4.5
| -
| 4.8
| -
| 1.4
| -
| 10
|-
| style="text-align:left;" | Lisbon
| style="background:; color:white;"|45.3
| 25
| 29.7
| 16
| 12.2
| 6
| 4.0
| 2
| 2.6
| 1
| 50
|-
| style="text-align:left;" | Madeira
| style="background:; color:white;"|62.4
| 4
| 20.2
| 1
| 1.0
| -
| 6.1
| -
| 1.9
| -
| 5
|-
| style="text-align:left;" | Portalegre
| style="background:; color:white;"|38.9
| 2
| 33.5
| 1
| 15.2
| -
| 3.3
| -
| 1.8
| -
| 3
|-
| style="text-align:left;" | Porto
| style="background:; color:white;"|51.3
| 21
| 32.9
| 13
| 6.4
| 2
| 4.1
| 1
| 1.1
| -
| 37
|-
| style="text-align:left;" | Santarém
| style="background:; color:white;"|49.1
| 6
| 29.4
| 3
| 9.8
| 1
| 3.3
| -
| 2.2
| -
| 10
|-
| style="text-align:left;" | Setúbal
| style="background:; color:white;"|34.7
| 6
| 28.4
| 5
| 24.9
| 5
| 2.7
| -
| 2.4
| -
| 16
|-
| style="text-align:left;" | Viana do Castelo
| style="background:; color:white;"|56.9
| 4
| 25.2
| 2
| 5.0
| -
| 7.2
| -
| 1.2
| -
| 6
|-
| style="text-align:left;" | Vila Real
| style="background:; color:white;"|60.6
| 4
| 26.0
| 2
| 2.6
| -
| 5.1
| -
| 1.2
| -
| 6
|-
| style="text-align:left;" | Viseu
| style="background:; color:white;"|64.3
| 7
| 19.4
| 2
| 2.1
| -
| 6.3
| -
| 1.3
| -
| 9
|-
| style="text-align:left;" | Europe
| style="background:; color:white;"|53.7
| 1
| 31.9
| 1
| 7.8
| -
| 3.0
| -
|colspan="2" rowspan="2" bgcolor="#AAAAAA"|
| 2
|-
| style="text-align:left;" | Outside Europe 
| style="background:; color:white;"|77.3
| 2
| 4.9
| -
| 1.0
| -
| 14.6
| -
| 2
|-
|- class="unsortable" style="background:#E9E9E9"
| style="text-align:left;" | Total
| style="background:; color:white;"|50.6
| 135
| 29.1
| 72
| 8.8
| 17
| 4.4
| 5
| 1.7
| 1
| 230
|-
| colspan=12 style="text-align:left;" | Source: Comissão Nacional de Eleições
|}

Maps

Notes

References

External links 
Comissão Nacional de Eleições 
Centro de Estudos do Pensamento Político

See also

Politics of Portugal
List of political parties in Portugal
Elections in Portugal

Legislative elections in Portugal
1991 elections in Portugal
October 1991 events in Europe